N. J. Kuncheria (1886–1967) set up the first rubber plantation in South India. He came from the Nalpathamkalam family, who were prominent Catholic aristocrats in Central Travancore. He became a member of the Sree Moolam Popular Assembly and was a promoter-director of Marthoma Rubber Company when it was incorporated in 1910. He spent his last phase of life at Veliyanad, from whence he had come.

1886 births
1967 deaths
Businesspeople from Thiruvananthapuram
Politicians from Thiruvananthapuram